Fred P. Evans (born 1862) was a British spiritualist medium.

He was born in Liverpool on 9 June 1862. His great grandfather was the Welsh social reformer Robert Owen. As a young man, Evans worked as a sailor and claimed to have experienced strange psychical events. In 1884 he moved to San Francisco where he gave séances to the public. Evans was an early proponent of slate-writing mediumship.

British biologist Alfred Russel Wallace who attended a séance with Evans in 1887 was convinced the slate-writing phenomena was genuine evidence for spirit communication and reported that there were five different coloured messages.

Slate-writing was popular in the late-nineteenth century but was discredited as fraudulent after investigations from magicians and psychical researchers. In 1898, the magician Chung Ling Soo revealed the fraudulent slate-writing methods that Evans, Henry Slade and others had utilized.

References

Further reading

David P. Abbott. (1912). Behind the Scenes with the Mediums  Chicago: The Open Court Publishing Company. Reveals fraudulent methods of producing slate-writing.
J. J. Owen. (1893). Psychography: Marvelous Manifestations of Psychic Power Given Through the Mediumship of Fred P. Evans, Known as the "Independent Slate-Writer". San Francisco, Hicks-Judd Company.

1862 births
Sailors from Liverpool
British spiritual mediums
Year of death missing